Dan Williams is a Canadian politician who was elected in the 2019 Alberta general election to represent the electoral district of Peace River in the 30th Alberta Legislature.

He currently resides in La Crete with his wife, Maureen, where he worked at Knelsen Sand & Gravel. While employed by Knelsen, Williams secured the United Conservative Party nomination in Peace River with 81% of the vote.

Williams has stated his support for immediately repealing the provincial carbon tax and reducing regulations to create the fastest regulatory approval process in North America. He also supports a one-third reduction in the corporate tax to promote economic growth. In January 2019, he appeared at a pro-resource rally where he stated, “We are not at all ashamed to defend (the oil and gas) industry, to defend the way we make a living and have for generations in this province.”

He is also in favour of reducing the rural crime rate through additional funding to the criminal justice system and strategic reforms to avoid suspected criminals escaping the justice system without a trial.

Williams supports school choice and is opposed to abortion.

Electoral history

References

United Conservative Party MLAs
Living people
Year of birth missing (living people)
People from Mackenzie County